Dapsilanthus is a genus of plants described as a genus in 1998.

Dapsilanthus is native to Southeast Asia, southern China, New Guinea, and northern Australia.

 Species
 Dapsilanthus disjunctus (Mast.) B.G.Briggs & L.A.S.Johnson - Guangxi, Hainan, Cambodia, Laos, W Malaysia, Thailand, Vietnam
 Dapsilanthus elatior (R.Br.) B.G.Briggs & L.A.S.Johnson - Queensland, Northern Territory, New Guinea, Aru Islands in Maluku
 Dapsilanthus ramosus (R.Br.) B.G.Briggs & L.A.S.Johnson - Queensland
 Dapsilanthus spathaceus (R.Br.) B.G.Briggs & L.A.S.Johnson - Queensland, Northern Territory, New Guinea, Aru Islands in Maluku

References

Restionaceae
Poales genera
Taxa named by Barbara G. Briggs
Taxa named by Lawrence Alexander Sidney Johnson
Taxa described in 1998